Ndivhudzannyi Ralivhona (born 30 June 1996), known by her stage name Makhadzi, is a South African singer. Born and raised in Ha-Mashamba, Limpopo, her career began at the age of 12 as dancer prior pursuing a music career as a singer, while she was attending school she signed a record deal with Rita Dee Entertainment and released Muhwalo Uya Ndemela in 2015. She garnered local attention after her single "Tshanda Vhuya" released in 2017. Her eight studio album Matorokisi (2019), debuted at number two in South Africa.

Makhadzi's ninth studio album Kokovha  (2020), became one of her biggest successes and debuted at number one on the South African iTunes albums charts. It contained the chart-topping singles "Amadoda", "Mphemphe", "Kokovha" and "Tshikwama".

Her tenth studio album  African Queen (2021) was certified gold in South Africa.

Makhadzi's eleventh studio album  African Queen 2.0 (2022), reached number one in the country.

Early life 

Makhadzi was born in a small village called Ha-Mashamba Tshivhangani, just outside Elim in Limpopo province. After her parents separated, Ndivhudzannyi and her two siblings had to stay with their mother. She completed her grade 12 at Mukula Integrated School. Ndivhudzannyi obtained her qualification in Public Relations and she is currently studying drama.

Music career 
Her career started at the age of 13, where she used to perform at Taxi ranks, getting money from people's offerings. In 2010, Makhadzi joined a musical group Makhirikhiri as a dancer.

Shortly after she left dancing, she began working on her music career. Makhadzi independently released three studio albums Muvhango (2009), Ndo Tshinya Ni? (2011) and Litshani u Ntsala Murahu (2012).

On 1 December 2014 her fourth studio album Rita Dee was released.

In 2015, she attracted the attention of Rita Dee Entertainment and got signed a record deal, followed by the release of her album Muhwalo Uya Ndemela.

The following year she released her album Yo Shoma in 2017. The album scooped two awards for Best Female Artist and Tshivenda Best at Fame South African Music Awards.

Shumela Venda was released in 2017. It was supported by two singles "Dj Wa Vhorine" and "Tshanda Vhuya".

2019–2020: Matorokisi, Kokovha  
Makhadzi's breakthrough single "Matorokisi" was released in 2019, became one biggest song of her career.

Her studio album Matorokisi was released on 1 November 2019. The album peaked at number 2 on local iTunes/Apple Music South Africa and remained in the Top 5 for three days.

In 2019, Makhadzi was featured by Master KG on a song titled "Tshikwama", released off the album Jerusalema.

After she left Rita Dee Entertainment, Makhadzi bagged a record deal with Open Mic Productions.

On 16 October 2020, Makhadzi studio album Kokovha, was released in South Africa. The album features Mayten, Mampintsha, Prince Benza, Mr Brown, Gigi Lamayne, Jah Prayzah, Team Mosha, Moonchild Sanelly, FB, Charma Girl and Sho Madjozi. As of August 2021, her album was named the most stream on Apple Music. The album was certified with gold plaque.

2021–present: African Queen, Pain Ya Jealous, African Queen 2.0 
On 5 April 2021, Makhadzi released a single "Mjolo" featuring Mlindo the Vocalist. The song peaked number 28 on South Africa iTunes charts.

Her single "Ghanama" featuring Prince Benza, and King Monada was released on 7 July 2021. The song was certified platinum in South Africa. 

On 16 August she announced her album African Queen and release date on her Twitter. That same month she also released her single "Tchukutsha" featuring Lady Du on 7 August 2021.

On 6 August Kabza De Small teased a collaboration single "Salungano" with Makhadzi on YouTube, which was released on 2 September 2021. 

Her studio album African Queen, was released on 3 September 2021. The album features Cassper Nyovest, Kabza De Small and Lady Du.

At the 6th ceremony of All Africa Music Awards, she received a nomination for Best Female Artist in South Africa.

Pain Ya Jealous was released on 31 March 2022. The EP was certified Gold in South Africa.

Makhadzi announced working on her next studio album African Queen 2.0 on 17 October, captioned "#albumloading" over 30 songs were recorded throughout from early January to October.

Her eleventh studio album  was set to be released on 4 November, but postponed to 18 November 2022.

The African Queen 2.0 album which consists of 22 tracks was released on 11 November 2022 and featured other top artists in the country like Blaq Diamond, Big Zulu, Penny Penny, Yaba Buluku Boyz, Mr Brown and many others.  It reached number one in Botswana.

Business ventures 
In December 2021, Makhadzi launched  Kokovha brand in collaboration with Kicks Sportwear at Mall of Africa. 

In March 2022, she launched her body lotion brands Mavoda.

Discography

Studio albums 

 Shumela Venda (2018)
 Matorokisi (2019)
 Kokovha (2020)
 African Queen (2021)

EP's 
 Pain Ya Jealous (2022)

Television 

In 2018, Makhadzi was hosted on Yo TV for her first television performance. She has since conducted interviews with various radio stations, including Munghana Lonene FM, Phalaphala FM, Nzhelele FM, Makhado FM, Sloot FM, and Capricon FM, where she spoke about her music, life and her hardships. She also appeared on The Morning Show on ETV. Makhadzi was one of the performers at the 2020 DSTV Mzansi Viewers Choice Awards. Her performance was hailed as one of the best performances of the night on social media.

Awards and nominations

References 

Living people
21st-century South African women singers
Venda people
People from Limpopo
1996 births